Samraong (''impenetrable jungle'') is the capital of Oddar Meanchey Province in Northwestern Cambodia.

To the north of the city is the border crossing of O Smach into Thailand.

Gallery

References

 

Provincial capitals in Cambodia
Cities in Cambodia
Populated places in Oddar Meanchey province